Dublavídeo is a dubbing studio located in the city of São Paulo. It is currently responsible for dubbing most Sony Pictures titles in Brazil, including film and television. Also receives several works of 20th Century Fox.

Animation 
 9 (2nd dub)
 The Adventures of the Little Prince (shown in SBT)
 All Dogs Go to Heaven (2nd dub)
 ALVINNN! and the Chipmunks
 American Dad! (Seasons 1-5)
 Appleseed Alpha
 As Told by Ginger
 Breadwinners
 Bunsen Is a Beast
 The Cleveland Show (Season 1)
 The Day My Butt Went Psycho!
 The Dolphin: Story of a Dreamer
 El-Hazard (shown in Rede Bandeirantes)
 Family Guy (Seasons 6-8)
 Fatal Fury: Legend of the Hungry Wolf
 Fatal Fury 2: The New Battle
 Fatal Fury 3: Road to the Final Victory
 The Fearless Four
 Futurama (1999-2003)
 Ghost in the Shell
 Iron Man: Rise of Technovore
 Jackie Chan Adventures (Seasons 2-5)
 Jibaku-kun (shown in Rede Bandeirantes)
 Justin and the Knights of Valour
 The Nut Job
 Open Season 3
 Open Season: Scared Silly
 The Outback
 Ozzy (2nd dub)
 Paprika
 Pinky Malinky
 Resident Evil: Damnation
 Resident Evil: Degeneration
 Resident Evil: Vendetta
 Rise of the Teenage Mutant Ninja Turtles
 The Snow Queen
 Teenage Mutant Ninja Turtles (2012)
 Tokyo Godfathers
 Trust Me, I'm a Genie
 The Twisted Tales of Felix the Cat (shown in Rede Record)

Live action shows 
 Band of Brothers (Shown by Rede Bandeirantes)
 Big Time Rush
 Damages
 Dr. Hollywood
 Glee (Shown by in FOX and Rede Bandeirantes, 2016–Brazil)
 Hannibal
 How to Get Away with Murder
 Living with Fran
 Once Upon a Time
 Prison Break (Shown by Rede Globo and Rede Bandeirantes)
 That '70s Show
 True Jackson

References

External links 
 

Brazilian dubbing studios